Philodendron pinnatifidum, the comb-leaf philodendron, is a species of flowering plant in the Araceae. It is native to Venezuela (Bolívar, Aragua, Miranda, Distrito Federal)  and northwestern Brazil, and reportedly naturalized in Cuba.

References

pinnatifidum
Flora of South America
Plants described in 1797